Balotești is a commune in the northwestern part of Ilfov County, Muntenia, Romania. Two small rivers flow through this location: Cociovaliștea and Vlăsia. It is composed of three villages: Balotești, Dumbrăveni and Săftica.

The commune is named after an 18th-century boyar, Balotă, who owned local lands.

On 31 March 1995, a TAROM Romanian Airbus A310 crashed near Balotești, leaving 60 dead (see Tarom Flight 371).

Natives
 Marian Zidaru

References

Communes in Ilfov County
Localities in Muntenia